Standard components is a food technology term, when manufacturers buy in a standard component they would use a pre-made product in the production of their food.
They help products to be the same in consistency, they are quick and easy to use in batch production of food products.
Some examples are pre-made stock cubes, marzipan, icing, ready made pastry.

Usage
Manufacturers use standard components as they save time and sometimes cost a lot less and it also helps with consistency in products.
If a manufacturer is to use a standard component from another supplier it is essential that a precise and accurate specification is produced by the manufacturer so that the component meets the standards set by the manufacturer.

Advantages

Saves preparation time.
Fewer steps in the production process
Less effort and skill required by staff
Less machinery and equipment needed
Good quality
Saves money from all aspects
Can be bought in bulk
High-quality consistency 
Food preparation is hygienic

Disadvantages
Have to rely on other manufacturers to supply products
Fresh ingredients may taste better
May require special storage conditions
Less reliable than doing it yourself
Cost more to make 
Can't control the nutritional value of the product 
There is a larger risk of cross contamination.
 GCSE food technology

References

Food Technology Nelson Thornes, 2001 pg. 144

Components
Food industry
Food ingredients